Aytaç Kara (born 23 March 1993) is a Turkish professional footballer who plays as a defensive midfielder for Süper Lig club Kasımpaşa.

Club career
He made his Süper Lig debut on 31 August 2012.

Galatasaray
He signed a three-year contract with Galatasaray in the 2021-22 season.

On August 2, 2022, his contract was terminated on mutual agreement.

Göztepe
On 4 February 2022, he was loaned to Göztepe until the end of the season.

References

External links
 
 
 

1993 births
Living people
People from Bornova
Footballers from İzmir
Turkish footballers
Turkey international footballers
Turkey under-21 international footballers
Turkey youth international footballers
Altay S.K. footballers
Eskişehirspor footballers
Trabzonspor footballers
Yeni Malatyaspor footballers
Bursaspor footballers
Kasımpaşa S.K. footballers
Süper Lig players
Association football midfielders
Galatasaray S.K. footballers
Göztepe S.K. footballers